Klebyella is an extinct genus of sea snails, marine gastropod mollusks, in the family Liotiidae.

Species
The following species were brought into synonymy:
 Klebyella minuta Bandel, Gründel & Maxwell, 2000

References

Liotiidae
Monotypic gastropod genera